Bryan & Baxter was a paranormal claims investigation team composed of Bryan Bonner and Matthew M. Baxter.  Their investigations included claims of ghosts, poltergeists, psychics, UFOs, conspiracy theories, and urban legends.  They specialized in exposing frauds, and became associated with scientific skepticism. They were based in Denver, Colorado.

Background 

Bonner founded the Rocky Mountain Paranormal Society in 1999, influenced not by personal experiences of the paranormal, but by an interest in the paranormal developed by horror movies (such as The Exorcist), and the paranormal claims made in ghost hunting reality television shows.

Bryan & Baxter made the distinction that they did not investigate the paranormal, but rather the legitimacy of the paranormal claims made by others.  Their credentials included certifications from the manufacturers of the equipment they used and certification in electromagnetic field studies for broadcast equipment.

They brought a background in video and photography. They also worked with a network of people in other specialties, including geologists, medical doctors, video and audio production people, linguists, and magicians, the latter of special value due to their expertise in misdirection and perception.

Public outreach 
Bryan & Baxter gave presentations and classes to the public dealing with pseudoscience and the paranormal.  These events included presentations at the University of Colorado,  Metropolitan State University, Ohlone College, The Denver Art Museum, SkeptiCamp, The Amazing Meeting, and StarFest/HorrorFest.

At The Amazing Meeting in 2012, they assisted the James Randi Educational Foundation with its One Million Dollar Paranormal Challenge, a test that offered a one million dollar prize to anyone who could demonstrate a paranormal ability under controlled conditions.

Controversies

Denver Extraterrestrial Affairs Commission 

In 2010, Denver, Colorado resident Jeff Peckman initiated a citizen ballot proposal to create an Extraterrestrials Affairs Commission, to prepare for visits from extraterrestrials, and which garnered international interest. Bryan & Baxter headed the opposition group The Mission for Inhibiting Bureaucracy (The M.I.B.).   After the proposal was defeated, Peckman filed a complaint with the Denver Board of Ethics, where he says of Bryan & Baxter: "They are known as very disreputable, incompetent, unethical, and hostile persons within the field of paranormal research". The complaint goes on to suggest Bryan & Baxter's opposition to the ballot initiative was due to their involvement with the CIA, NSA, or other covert agencies.

In 2011, the Denver Board of Ethics dismissed this complaint for lack of jurisdiction, and because the complaint did not deal with any issues that are covered by the Denver Code of Ethics.

Stanley Hotel 

The television show Ghost Hunters had investigated the Stanley Hotel (the setting that inspired Stephen King's book The Shining), and claimed it had paranormal activity because of certain minerals present on the property. The hotel sells tickets to tour its paranormal activity and haunted areas. In 2008, Bryan & Baxter worked with the USDA to perform a soil survey of the premises, with the result showing that the claimed minerals were not in fact present. Bonner states that the hotel owners then asked they not spread the results of this report.

Colorado Springs Evergreen Cemetery 

In June 2011, Bryan & Baxter, along with others, paid for a late night "Haunted Tour" in Colorado Springs, Colorado offered by the ghost hunting group Pure Paranormal.  After the tour, Bryan & Baxter contacted the cemetery manager to complain of what they felt was unethical and disrespectful behavior during the tour on the part of Pure Paranormal.  The city subsequently ended the Pure Paranormal tours, and instituted new policies to restrict such cemetery activity.

Bryan & Baxter presented this at the 2011 Colorado SkeptiCamp conference, and this presentation was recorded and posted on the web. Pure Paranormal filed a copyright complaint about the video, and the video hosting service withdrew the video.  This action was disputed and the video was later restored.

KDVR UFOs over Denver 
In November 2012,  Investigative Reporter Heidi Hemmat of Fox News affiliate KDVR News did a story about a video sent in by a source wishing to remain anonymous, of several blurry unidentified flying objects filmed near Denver, Colorado.  The story received world-wide attention.  Hemmat insisted the objects were not birds, bugs, or planes,  and that no one was able to determine what they were.  Bryan and Baxter contacted Hemmat, questioning that conclusion, and offering their own video and analysis demonstrating the objects could in fact be birds or bugs.  On a follow-up segment aired Nov 20, Hemmat continued to claim the objects remained unexplained.

Selected media coverage

Filmography

Television

Books

References

External links 
 Rocky Mountain Paranormal Research Society

Living people
Scientific skepticism mass media
Paranormal investigators
American skeptics
People from Denver
Year of birth missing (living people)